TBN Inspire is an American Christian broadcast television network owned by the Trinity Broadcasting Network (TBN). It is carried on the digital subchannels of TBN's stations.

The network originally launched as The Church Channel, which focused on carrying brokered broadcasts of various Christian church services. In 2016, the network was re-launched as a broadcast feed of Hillsong Channel—a joint venture with the Hillsong Church, which added its services and original programming to the schedule. In 2022, the network rebranded again as TBN Inspire, maintaining the same format.

History 
The network originally launched on January 14, 2002, as The Church Channel, which was devoted primarily to carrying church service programs from various Christian ministries and denominations, often under brokered arrangements.

On March 9, 2016, TBN announced a partnership with the Sydney-based international congregation Hillsong Church, that would see The Church Channel re-branded as the Hillsong Channel—a network devoted to its ministry, teaching, and worship music. Hillsong founder Brian Houston stated that the channel would be a "Christ-centred, Bible-based television channel that changes mindsets and empowers people to lead and impact in every sphere of life", and would be "constantly looking towards the future–filled with a vision that inspires and influences many." The new channel officially launched June 1, 2016. An over-the-top subscription service, Hillsong Channel Now, launched in November 2017.

On January 1, 2022, the US feed of the network was rebranded as TBN Inspire, with no change in programming. TBN stated in a notice to carriage providers that the change was intended to "speak more clearly to how we are programming the network".

The international Hillsong Channel operations and the Hillsong Channel Now online service were initially unaffected by the January 2022 rebrand in the United States. However, following Hillsong Church's internal investigation over the alleged inappropriate behavior against women by co-founder Brian Houston, and his subsequent resignation as the church's senior global pastor in March 2022, TBN began rebranding its linear Hillsong Channel operations outside the U.S. as TBN Inspire as well beginning April 2022, and removed Hillsong programming from their schedule (with a version operated by TBN Pacific, which is available in Australia, following suit on April 28). The Hillsong Channel website and Hillsong Channel Now service, as operated by the church, remain operational as of April 2022.

Programming 
TBN Inspire programs a mix of original programming and outside televangelism.

As Hillsong Channel 
Shows not produced by Hillsong or TBN were billed as "partner programs".
 Hillsong Church Services from worldwide Hillsong congregations, including London, Sydney, New York and Los Angeles.
 Best of Hillsong Conference
 Hillsong Conference Live
 What Do You See? with Robert Fergusson
 Brian Houston TV
 Colour Conference: Main Stage, Green Room, The Edition
 Chapel: The College Experience – Services and stories from the Hillsong International Leadership College
 What's Cooking with Young & Free – Cooking series with a comedic bent
 Hillsong Kids: A Big Life – Children's programme for ages 6–12
 Hillsong Kids Jr Cubby House – Children's programme for ages 3–5
 Sex, Love, and Relationships
 "Worship by Hillsong" – Music videos by Hillsong United, Hillsong Worship, and Hillsong Young & Free
 Pastor Robert Morris Ministries (sermons from Gateway Church)
 Elevation Church
 Joel Osteen
 Enjoying Everyday Life

Hillsong Channel also aired specials documentaries, other worship programming and music programming such as a special around Let There Be Light, along with other Hillsong events and short series.

Availability 
TBN Inspire is available over-the-air on digital subchannels of TBN stations, and via select U.S. cable providers, Dish Network, Glorystar (free-to-air Galaxy 19) and DirecTV, in the UK and Ireland on Sky and in many nations around the world via direct-to-home satellite, such as ABS1 to India and the Middle East, Hot Bird satellite to Europe, and Agila 2 satellite both C-band and Ku-Band signal in Asia and the Philippines. The network also livestreams its programming on its official website, along with TBN's streaming apps.

In late May 2019, Olympusat, the main provider of TBN's networks to cable providers in the United States (including Spectrum and Xfinity), discontinued carriage of the network, thus affecting carriage of Hillsong Channel to those systems.

International versions

TBN Pacific version (Australia, New Zealand and rest of Oceania)
On July 24, 2016, the IPTV service Fetch TV began carrying the version of Hillsong Channel as operated by TBN Pacific. On September 11, 2016, it was announced that multichannel television provider Foxtel would carry Hillsong Channel on its satellite and cable television services.

In April 2022, it was reported that the particular version would be rebranded as TBN Inspire on April 28, with Hillsong content replaced by TBN original programming (such as Praise), and other worship music and televangelism programming. The change, along with Australian Network 10's removal of Hillsong-produced programs from its schedules, came amid controversies involving Brian Houston, who resigned from his position as senior pastor after being indicted in a misconduct investigation by the ministry.

References

External links 
 

Evangelical television networks
English-language television stations in the United States
Hillsong Church
Religious television stations in the United States
Trinity Broadcasting Network
Television channels and stations established in 2002